Events in the year 1966 in Belgium.

Incumbents
Monarch: Baudouin
Prime Minister: Pierre Harmel (until 19 March), Paul Vanden Boeynants (from 19 March)

Events

 31 January – Clashes between gendarmes and demonstrators from the closing Zwartberg mine leave two colliers dead.
 10 February – Belgium ratifies London Fisheries Convention.
 11 February – Pierre Harmel proffers his resignation as prime minister due to internal policy divisions in his Christian Democrat–Socialist coalition.
 15 February to 9 May – Women at FN Herstal strike for equal pay.
 15 March – London Fisheries Convention regulating fisheries in the North Sea comes into force.
 19 March – Paul Vanden Boeynants takes office at the head of a Christian Democrat–Liberal coalition.
 11 May – Real Madrid defeat FK Partizan in the 1966 European Cup Final at the Heysel Stadium.
 13 May
 Belgian bishops issue a declaration rejecting calls to remove the French-language section of the Catholic University of Leuven from the city of Leuven.
Elizabeth II visits Langemark to pay her respects at the Saint Julien Memorial to Canadian soldiers of the First World War.
 2 June – Demonstration in Brussels in support of equal pay for equal work.

Publications
 OECD, Economic Surveys: Belgium–Luxembourg Economic Union.

Art
 René Magritte La Décalcomanie

Births
 26 January – Conny Aerts, astrophysicist
 25 April – Eliane Tillieux, politician
 9 July – Amélie Nothomb, novelist
 15 July – Elisa Brune, writer and journalist (died 2018)
 6 September – Joachim Coens, politician and businessman
 27 October – Nathalie Loriers, jazz musician
 5 December – Patrick Ouchène, singer

Deaths
 4 January – Georges Theunis (born 1873), former Prime Minister
 8 January – Marthe Cnockaert (born 1892), spy
 10 March – Émile Coulonvaux (born 1892), politician
 29 March – Albert-Édouard Janssen (born 1883), politician and banker
 19 April – Albert Servaes (born 1883), painter
 5 December – Sylvère Maes (born 1909), racing cyclist 
 29 December – Pierre Nothomb (born 1887), writer and politician

References

 
1960s in Belgium
Belgium
Years of the 20th century in Belgium
Belgium